The Coca-Cola Triangular Series was the name of the One Day International cricket tournament in India held in 1998. It was a tri-nation series between Kenya, India and Bangladesh.

India and Kenya reached the finals through a round robin league format. India beat Kenya in the Finals to clinch the trophy.

Squads

Group stage points table
India and Kenya advanced to the Finals on the basis of points.

Match results

1st match

2nd match

3rd match

4th match

5th match

6th match

Final

References

External links

1998 in cricket
Indian cricket seasons from 1970–71 to 1999–2000
1998 in Indian cricket
One Day International cricket competitions